The Central Deccan Plateau dry deciduous forests in Western and Southern India, containing large protected areas of natural tiger habitat.

Distribution
The Deccan Plateau is a large triangular plateau in southern India, bounded by the Western Ghats range to the west, the Eastern Ghats to the east, and the western Satpura Range to the north. The ecoregion lies mostly within the states of Maharashtra and Telangana, extending into adjacent parts of Madhya Pradesh, Chhattisgarh, and Andhra Pradesh. In Maharashtra, the Central Deccan Plateau dry deciduous forests cover most of the Vidarbha region, including the city of Nagpur. In Telangana, the dry deciduous forests cover much of the state, including Hyderabad, the state capital, with a small portion extending across the Eastern Ghats to the Bay of Bengal in Krishna District of Andhra Pradesh.

Typically the plateau extends from the Konkan Deccan divide north of Pune to the Krishna river in Telangana. Majority of the geology of the region is of Basaltic rocks which harbor a very different drainage pattern and different forest cover with an average mature tree height of over 10 metres, while the granitoid region that is primarily affluent across Telangana and parts of Karnataka covers scrub jungle with an average tree height of around 5 metres. A small part of Nallamala hill range that encompass the Amrabad Tiger Reserve and Srisailam Tiger Reserves are sedimentary rock scapes with dry thick vegetation and added to the ecoregion. All three forests have many uniquely different landscapes, easily visible, within this unique ecoregion. For example in the granitoid region, tigers, jackals, wild dogs and wolves are all extinct, while the peninsular rock agama is only found here. 

The xeric Deccan thorn scrub forests lie to the west, south, and southeast, covering the drier portions of the plateau in the rain shadow of the Western Ghats. The more humid Eastern Highlands moist deciduous forests lie to the northeast and east, while the Narmada Valley dry deciduous forests lie across the Satpuras to the northwest.

The Godavari River crosses the ecoregion from its source in the Western Ghats and indeed most of the rivers on the plateau drain east towards the Bay of Bengal, with the exception of the Tapti River in the northwestern corner of the plateau, which drains westward into the Arabian Sea.

This is a highly populated area and most of the natural forest in the ecoregion has been cleared for firewood or grazing land or as a result of river damming, all of which are ongoing. However large blocks of original habitat such as the Nagarjunsagar-Srisailam Tiger Reserve in Telangana and Andhra Pradesh do remain.

Flora
Woodlands of Hardwickia binata and Albizia amara are the characteristic plant community of this ecoregion, distinguishing it from the predominantly teak (Tectona grandis) or sal (Shorea robusta) woodlands found elsewhere in the Deccan. The Central Deccan forests have an upper canopy at 15–25 meters, and an understory at 10–15 meters, with little undergrowth. The Hardwickia trees lose their leaves during the winter dry season, and leaf out again in April. Other tree species in the northern part of the ecoregion include teak, Boswellia serrata, Lannea coromandelica, Anogeissus latifolia, Albizia lebbeck, Lagerstroemia parvifolia, Diospyros tomentosa, and Acacia catechu.

Fauna
The large areas of remaining forest on the plateau are still home to a variety of grazing animals from the four-horned antelope (Tetracerus quadricornis), chinkara (Gazella bennettii), and blackbuck (Antilope cervicapra) to the large gaur and wild water buffalo (Bubalus arnee). Large carnivores include Bengal tigers (Panthera tigris tigris), the dhole (wild dog, Cuon alpinus), and sloth bear (Melursus ursinus). The area is home to nearly ninety mammal species. Some of the larger species mentioned here are rare, as is the threatened Indian giant squirrel (Ratufa indica). The 300 species of birds include the globally threatened Jerdon's courser (Rhinoptilus bitorquatus), which was rediscovered in 1986 having been thought extinct for nearly a hundred years.

Conservation
About 80 percent of the natural habitat in the ecoregion has been lost. Several blocks of habitat larger than 5,000 km2 remain. Fifteen protected areas cover almost 3% of the ecoregion's area, with Nagarjunsagar-Srisailam Tiger Reserve as the largest.

 Bor Wildlife Sanctuary, Wardha District, Maharashtra (80 km2)
 Chaprala Wildlife Sanctuary, Gadchiroli district, Maharashtra (130 km2)
 Gautala Autramghat Sanctuary, Aurangabad and Jalgaon districts, Maharashtra (260 km2)
 Gundla Brahmeswaram Wildlife Sanctuary, Kurnool and Prakasam districts, Andhra Pradesh (120 km2)
 Katepurna Wildlife Sanctuary, Akola District, Maharashtra (420 km2)
 Kolleru Wildlife Sanctuary, Andhra Pradesh (220 km2, partly in Eastern Highlands moist deciduous forests ecoregion)
 Manjira Wildlife Sanctuary, Medak district, Telangana (30 km2)
 Nagarjunsagar-Srisailam Tiger Reserve, Telangana and Andhra Pradesh (3,568 km2)
 Nagzira Wildlife Sanctuary, Bhandara and Gondia districts, Maharashtra (150 km2)
 Navegaon National Park, Gondia district, Maharashtra (170 km2)
 Painganga Wildlife Sanctuary, Yavatmal district, Maharashtra (130 km2)
 Pench National Park, Seoni and Chhindwara districts, Madhya Pradesh (440 km2)
 Pocharam Wildlife Sanctuary, Medak district, Telangana (120 km2)
 Tadoba Andhari Reserve, Chandrapur district, Maharashtra (625 km2)
 Tipeshwar Wildlife Sanctuary, Yavatmal district, Maharashtra (160 km2)
 Kawal Tiger Reserve, Komaram Bheem Asifabad District, Telangana (160 km2)

See also
List of ecoregions in India
Arid Forest Research Institute (AFRI)

References

External links
 

 
Ecoregions of India
Environment of Maharashtra
Environment of Telangana
Forests of India
Indomalayan ecoregions
Tropical and subtropical dry broadleaf forests